Shruthi or variations may refer to:

 Śruti, an ancient religious texts comprising the central canon of Hinduism

People
 Shruthi Leon, daughter of Cottalango Leon
 Shruthi Raj, Indian film and television actress
 Shruti (actress) (born 1976), Kannada language actress
 Shruti Sharma (born 1981), Indian model and actress
 Shruti Haasan (born 1986), Indian actress and singer
 Sruthi Lakshmi (born 1986), Indian actress 
 Sruthi Hariharan (born 1989), Indian dancer and actress
 Shruti Kotwal (born 1991), Indian ice speed skater
 Shruti Sharma (actress) (born 1994), Indian actress

Other uses
 Shruthi (film), a 1990 Kannada film, directed by Dwarakish
 Sruti (magazine), a magazine devoted to Indian music and dance
 Shruti (music), the smallest interval in Indian classical music
 Shruti box, an Indian drone instrument
 ShruthiUK, a UK based non-profit organisation

See also
 Shrutika (born 1986), Indian actress